The 1983 World Rowing Championships were World Rowing Championships that were held from 3 to 4 September 1983 at Wedau in Duisburg, West Germany.

Medal summary

Men's events

Women's events

Medals table 
Seventeen nations won medals of the championships.

References

Rowing competitions in Germany
World Rowing Championships
World Rowing Championships
Rowing
Rowing
Rowing